Air Vice Marshal Sir Thomas Ulric Curzon Shirley,  (4 June 1908 – 16 January 1982) was a Royal Air Force officer who served as Air Officer Commanding-in-Chief Signals Command from 1964 until 1966.

RAF career
Shirley was commissioned as a Royal Air Force cadet at RAF Cranwell in 1928, and became a pilot in 1930, serving for the Army Cooperation Squadrons until 1936, when he became a Technical Specialist Officer in Signals Communications He served the Second World War as a Signals Officer at Headquarters RAF Middle East and then as a Staff Officer in the Directorate of Telecommunications at the Air Ministry. After the war he became deputy director of Signals at the Air Ministry and then Chief Signals Officer at Headquarters Transport Command before becoming Director of Radio Engineering at the Air Ministry in 1950. He went on to be Senior Technical Staff Officer at Headquarters Fighter Command in 1959 and Air Officer Commanding-in-Chief at Signals Command in 1964 before retiring in 1966.

Personal life
He married Vera Overton.

References

1908 births
1982 deaths
Companions of the Order of the Bath
Knights Commander of the Order of the British Empire
Royal Air Force air marshals
Royal Air Force personnel of World War II